James Sibree Anderson (December 25, 1841 – May 9, 1927) was a member of the Wisconsin State Assembly.

Biography
Anderson was born on December 25, 1841, in Kelvin Haugh, now part of Glasgow, Scotland. He moved to what is now Kossuth, Wisconsin in 1852 and later to Manitowoc, Wisconsin. During the American Civil War, he served with the 5th Wisconsin Volunteer Infantry Regiment of the Union Army, achieving the rank of sergeant. In 1870, Anderson graduated from Lawrence University.

On July 17, 1873, Anderson married Eva M. Mills, daughter of Joseph Trotter Mills. They had two children. Anderson died on May 9, 1927.

Political career
Anderson was a member of the Assembly from 1889 to 1890. Other positions he held include alderman and city attorney of Manitowoc and county judge of Manitowoc County, Wisconsin. He was a Republican.

References

External links

1841 births
1927 deaths
Burials in Wisconsin
Wisconsin city attorneys
Lawrence University alumni
Republican Party members of the Wisconsin State Assembly
Politicians from Glasgow
People from Manitowoc, Wisconsin
People of Wisconsin in the American Civil War
Scottish emigrants to the United States
Union Army soldiers
Wisconsin city council members
19th-century American politicians
Wisconsin state court judges
People from Kossuth, Wisconsin
19th-century American lawyers
County judges in the United States